The Hohe Munde is a  mountain at the eastern end of the Mieming Chain in the Austrian state of Tyrol. It has two peaks: the west top (2,662 m) and the east top or Mundekopf (2,592 m).

Location 
The Hohe Munde rises north of the village of Telfs in the Inn valley. To the east is the Seefeld Plateau and the Leutasch village of Moos. To the north it is separated from the Wetterstein Mountains by the valley of Gaistal. To the west, the Mieming Chain stretches away into the distance. Beyond the saddle of Niedere Munde (2,059 m) is the next peak in the chain, the 2,469 metre high Karkopf, followed by the 2,719 metre high  Hochwand.

Ascent 
The mountain may be climbed on an easy but strenuous tour from Moos via the Rauth Hut (1,605 m). The cable car from Moos to the Rauth Hut (the Mundelift) is no longer working. On the eastern slopes of the Mundekopf extensive avalanche defences have been built to protect the village of Sagl. These were finished in August 2014.

Sure-footed and experienced climbers can also climb the Hohe Munde from Telfs - branching off in Straßberg to the saddle of the Niedere Munde - via the western arête, a route graded as UIAA I. There are several climbing routes up the north and south faces below both the east and west tops, some of which are difficult.

A ski tour is possible over the steep (up to 45 degrees) east side in the spring. However, this requires safe firn conditions and a very early start.

Drama and television 
In 1990, the drama Munde by Felix Mitterer was premiered on the Hohe Munde.
In 2009 the Tatort episode, Baum der Erlösung, was partly filmed in the summit area of the Hohe Munde.

References

Literature

External links 

Two-thousanders of Austria
Mountains of Tyrol (state)
Innsbruck-Land District
Mieming Range
Mountains of the Alps